Geneviève Kervine (1931–1989) was a French film actress. Born in Dakar in French Senegal, she emerged as a star in the 1950s and was awarded with the Prix Suzanne Bianchetti for the most promising actress in 1955. She was married to the singer and actor Jean Bretonnière.

Career 
Kervine was active on stage and in French film productions from 1952 to 1962. Film roles included Les Nuits de Montmartre (1955, based on a novel by Claude Orval), and the female lead in Alerte au Deuxieme Bureau (1956). Her last film role was in C'est Pas Moi, C'est L'autre (1962).

Personal life 
Geneviéve Kervine was married to actor and singer Jean Bretonnière in 1967. They had a son, Marc Bretonnière, who also became an actor, especially successful in voice parts (he was the French voice of Darth Maul, for example). She was 58 when she died from cancer in Paris, in 1989.

Selected filmography
 Virgile (1953)
 Wonderful Mentality (1953)
 A Hundred Francs a Second (1953)
 Eighteen Hour Stopover (1955)
 Four Days in Paris (1955)
 Pity for the Vamps (1956)
 A Certain Monsieur Jo (1958)
 It's Not My Business (1962)

References

Bibliography
 Rob Craig. American International Pictures: A Comprehensive Filmography. McFarland, 2019.

External links

1931 births
1989 deaths
French film actresses
People from Dakar
20th-century French women